Gechi Qeshlaq-e Sofla (also Romanized as Gechī Qeshlāq-e Soflá; also known as 'Gechī Qeshlāq-e Pā'īn) is a village in Garamduz Rural District, Garamduz District, Khoda Afarin County, East Azerbaijan Province, Iran. At the 2006 census, its population was 74, in 16 families.

References 

Populated places in Khoda Afarin County